Puskiakiwenin 122 is an Indian reserve in Alberta. It belongs to the Frog Lake First Nation, a Cree nation.

References 

Indian reserves in Alberta
Cree